FC Magnitogorsk is a Russian football team from Magnitogorsk. It played professionally from 1948 to 1949, 1959 to 2003 and in 2005. It plays in the Amateur Football League. It played on the second-highest level (Soviet First League and Russian First Division) in 1948–1949, 1958–1962, 1968–1969 and 1992–1993.

Team name history
 1932–1938 Metallurg Vostoka Magnitogorsk
 1939–1996 Metallurg Magnitogorsk
 1997–1998 Magnitka Magnitogorsk
 1998–2003 Metallurg-Metiznik Magnitogorsk
 2004 FC Magnitogorsk
 2005 Metallurg-Metiznik Magnitogorsk
 2006–present FC Magnitogorsk

External links
  Official Site

Association football clubs established in 1932
Football clubs in Russia
FC
1932 establishments in Russia